Acanthochondria cornuta is a species of parasitic copepod from the northeast Atlantic Ocean, and the type species of the genus Acanthochondria. It infects the gills of several species of flatfish, particularly the European flounder (Platichthys flesus). Copepodids and immature females infect the holobranch of the host, while adult females prefer the pseudobranch and the internal wall, suggesting they migrate upstream in the gills of the host as they mature.

Reproduction
Males in this species are several times smaller than the females, and attach themselves permanently onto special 'nuptial organs' on their mates. These organs are paired, and therefore a single female can sometimes hold two males. In Portuguese waters, reproduction happens year round, and at least two generations are seemingly produced per year, a summer-autumn generation, and a winter-spring generation. Females of the former are smaller and produce less eggs, while those of the latter are larger and more fecund but produce smaller eggs.

See also
 Fish diseases and parasites

References 

Poecilostomatoida
Parasitic crustaceans
Animal parasites of fish
Crustaceans described in 1776
Taxa named by Otto Friedrich Müller
Crustaceans of the Atlantic Ocean